Black Birders Week is a week-long series of online events to highlight Black nature enthusiasts and to increase the visibility of Black birders, who face unique challenges and dangers when engaging in outdoor activities. The event was created as a response to the Central Park birdwatching incident and police brutality against Black Americans. The inaugural event ran from May 31 to June 5, 2020. The week of events was organized by a group of STEM professionals and students known as the BlackAFinSTEM collective.

Origin
Black Birders Week was announced on Twitter on May 29, 2020. The initiative was prompted in part by the Central Park birdwatching incident and the murders of African Americans such as Ahmaud Arbery, Breonna Taylor, and George Floyd. According to co-founder Anna Gifty Opoku-Agyeman, the goal of the initiative is "normalizing the fact that Black people exist in the birding and natural sciences community". Black people have historically been excluded from academic and professional spaces and lack visibility and representation in the natural sciences community and among birders in particular.  .

The week-long event was conceived and organized by members of a group of science, technology, engineering, and mathematics (STEM) professionals and students known as BlackAFinSTEM collective. In addition to Opoku-Agyeman, other co-founders include Jason Ward, Sheridan Alford, Danielle Belleny, Chelsea Connor, Joseph Saunders, and Tykee James.

2020 series
The event series ran from May 31 to June 5 using the #BlackBirdersWeek hashtag on Twitter and Instagram. Through these events and others, the series highlighted research carried out by Black birders, the happiness they find in nature, the racism experienced, and the importance of inclusivity in the outdoors. Furthermore, the series drew attention to several Black birders and naturalists, including Birds of North America host Jason Ward, wildlife biologist  J. Drew Lanham, wildlife conservationist Corina Newsome, National Audubon Society's government affairs coordinator Tykee James, and herpetologist   Earyn McGee.

Response 
In response to the 2020 series, the National Wildlife Federation planned to dedicate part of their Conservation Fellowship and Intern Programs to young biologists of color. The organisers intend to continue the series in future years. The event also inspired other similar week-long events celebrating Black people in various STEM fields, #BlackInAstro week, #BlackBotanistsWeek,  #BlackInNeuro, and #BlackInChem.

Media coverage 
The series was endorsed and promoted by advocacy groups, conservation organizations, and government agencies including: the National Audubon Society, the American Birding Association, the American Bird Conservancy, the North American Association for Environmental Education, the National Wildlife Refuge System, the US National Park Service, the California Coastal Commission, Outdoor Afro, Orion magazine, and the Ecological Society of America. The 2020 series was also highlighted by several science and popular media and news outlets including: CNN,  Forbes, The Guardian, Science, Scientific American,  National Geographic, Smithsonian magazine, Audubon magazine, Bird Watching magazine, Sierra Club, Backpacker magazine, and NPR.

2021 series
In 2021, the week was continued.

References

External links 
 Birding While Black: A Candid Conversation - Session 1 and Session 2, organized as part of the 2020 Black Birders Week

Black Lives Matter
Birdwatching
May 2020 events in the United States
Anti-racism in the United States
Environmental organizations based in the United States
Awareness weeks
Black in STEM weeks